Bannock may mean:

 Bannock (food), a kind of bread, cooked on a stone or griddle
 Bannock (Indigenous American), various types of bread, usually prepared by pan-frying
 Bannock people, a Native American people of what is now southeastern Oregon and western Idaho
 Bannock County, Idaho
 Bannock, Ohio
 Bannock Pass, between Idaho and Montana
 Russell Bannock (1919–2020), Canadian World War II flying ace and test pilot

See also 
Bannack, Montana, town named after the tribe, today a ghost town